Karen Knorr HonFRPS is a German-born American photographer who lives in London. In 2018 she received an Honorary Fellowship of the Royal Photographic Society.

Life and work
Knorr was born in Frankfurt and raised in the 1960s in San Juan, Puerto Rico. In the 1970s, she moved to Great Britain where she has lived ever since.
Knorr is a graduate of the Polytechnic of Central London (now the University of Westminster), and has an MA from the University of Derby. She is Professor of Photography at the University for the Creative Arts.

Knorr's work explores Western cultural traditions, mainly British society, with widely ranging topics, from lifestyle to animals. She is interested in conceptual art, visual culture, feminism, and animal studies, and her art maintains connections with these topics.

Between 1979 and 1981 Knorr produced Belgravia, a series of black and white photographs each accompanied by a short text, typically critical to the British class system of the time. Subsequently, she produced Gentlemen (1981-1983), a series consisting of photographs of gentlemen's members clubs and texts taken from parliamentary speeches and news reports. In these series, Knorr investigated values of the English upper middle classes, comparing them with aristocratic values. In 1986, the series Connoisseurs was made in color. The series incorporates staged events into English architectural interiors. Between 1994 and 2004, Knorr photographed fine art academies throughout Europe, which resulted in the series Academies.

In 2008, she traveled to Rajasthan and took a large series of photographs, predominantly showing Indian interiors, often with animals from Indian folklore inside. She subsequently became a frequent traveller to India, visiting the country 15 times between 2008 and 2014. She mentioned that most of the buildings in India were never photographed, and they are not less interesting than common tourist attractions.

From 2014 to 2015, one room of Tate Britain hosted an exhibition of her photographs of "posh west Londoners in domestic settings and portraits of members at a gentlemen's club" (Belgravia series).

Publications

Publications by Knorr
Karen Knorr. 2001. By Antonio Guzman.
Marks of Distinction. London: Thames and Hudson, 1991. . With an introduction by Patrick Mauries, "The Outsider"; and an interview by Antonio Guzman with Knorr.
Genii Loci: the Photographic Work of Karen Knorr. London: Black Dog, 2002. . Photographs, and texts by Antonio Guzman, "Rewind and fast-forward: photography, allegory and palimpsest"; Rebecca Comay and Knorr, "Natural histories"; and David Campany, "Museum and medium: the time of Karen Knorr's imagery". An overview of Knorr's work from the 1990s to 2002.
Fables. Trézélan: Filigranes, 2008. . With texts by Lucy Soutter and Nathalie Leleu. Text in French and English.
Karen Knorr. Madrid: La Fábrica; Córdoba, Spain: University of Córdoba, 2011. . Text in Spanish, English and French.
India Song. Skira, 2014. . Edited by Falvo Rosa Maria. With a preface by William Dalrymple, an essay by Christopher Pinney, and an interview by Rosa Maria Falvo.
Belgravia. London: Stanley Barker, 2015. . Edition of 1000 copies.
Gentlemen. London: Stanley Barker, 2016. .
Questions (After Brecht). London: Gost, 2020. . With an interview by Campany.

Publications paired with others
Punks. With Olivier Richon. London: Gost, 2013. With an essay by Knorr and Richon. . Edition of 1000 copies.

Publications with contributions by Knorr
 From Talbot to Fox. 150 Years of British Social Photography. London: James Hyman, 2012. Edition of 50 copies. An overview of British social photography published to accompany an exhibition by James Hyman Photography at The AIPAD Photography Show New York in 2011. Includes photographs by William Henry Fox Talbot, David Octavius Hill & Robert Adamson, Roger Fenton, Horatio Ross, Julia Margaret Cameron, Thomas Annan, Bill Brandt, Bert Hardy, Roger Mayne, Cecil Beaton, Caroline Coon, Paul Reas, Jem Southam, Ken Grant, Karen Knorr, Anna Fox and others.
 Lacoue-Labarthe, Philippe, Patrick Roegiers and Christopher Meatyard. "Theatre des Realites". Paris: Metz Pour la Photography (1986). 28-31, 108-109.

Exhibitions
Belgravia 1979–81 and Gentlemen 1981–83, Tate Britain, London, 2014/2015.
 Karen Knorr, India Song, Slowtrack Society, Madrid, Spain, 2015.
 Karen Knorr, Monogatari, Filles du Calvaire, Paris, 2015.

Awards
2018: Honorary Fellowship of the Royal Photographic Society, Bath

References

External links
 

American photographers
American women photographers
Photographers from Frankfurt
American emigrants to England
Alumni of the University of Westminster
Alumni of the University of Derby
Academics of the University for the Creative Arts
Year of birth missing (living people)
Living people
German emigrants to the United States
American women academics